Georg Vestel (11 November 1882 Saadjärve Parish – 5 February 1933 Tallinn) was an Estonian entrepreneur and politician.

From 1921 to 1924  he was Minister of Finance.

References

Finance ministers of Estonia
1882 births
1933 deaths